Colegio Español Don Bosco is a private Spanish international school in Barrio Elá-Nguema, Malabo, Equatorial Guinea. It serves levels Educación Infantil through Bachillerato (senior high school/sixth form college).

See also

 Education in Equatorial Guinea
 List of international schools

References

Educational institutions with year of establishment missing
Buildings and structures in Malabo
Elementary and primary schools in Equatorial Guinea
International high schools
International schools in Equatorial Guinea
Private schools in Africa
Spanish international schools in Africa
High schools and secondary schools in Equatorial Guinea